Reading Angel: The TV Spin-off With a Soul is a 2005 academic publication relating to the fictional Buffyverse established by TV series, Buffy and Angel.

Book description and contents

The collection covers many topics including Angel's setting, the cinematic aesthetics of Angel, its music, shifting portrayals of masculinity, the noir Los Angeles setting, the superhero, the evolution of the show's characters and the series' premature end.

External links
Phil-books.com - Review of this book
slayageonline.com - Chapter from this book

Books about the Buffyverse
2005 non-fiction books